JZ Microphones (Juris Zarins Microphones) is a Latvian manufacturer of professional microphones and recording accessories.

History 

JZ Microphones was established in 2007 in Riga by jeweler Juris Zarins. After 20 years of repairing Neumann, AKG, Telefunken microphones and participating in Blue and Violet microphones manufacturing he started to produce his own line of microphones.

In 2013, the first product "J1" from the new low-budget microphone series "J" was presented. It gained significant recognition and worldwide recognition, becoming especially popular in China and Russia. This year it was nominated for the 29th TEC Awards in the category "microphone technology for recordings".

Microphones and accessories 

JZ Microphones produces ten microphone models, in whose creation twenty-four patents owned by company are used. Most of the microphones are made with ‘’Golden drop’’ technology – a slightly different gilding process of capsule; in result the sound is much natural and cleaner. Also the original design of microphones differ JZ from other microphones, one of the most popular model series Black Hole unique design with hole in body makes attaching easier and also reduces unnecessary sounds.

Sound engineers and producers that use JZ Microphones JZ:

 Andy Gill
 Sylvia Massy
 Dave Jerden
 Kurt Hugo Schneider
 Michael Wagener
 Rafa Sardina
 Bryan Carlstrom
 Rob Chiarelli
 Marc Urselli

References 

Microphone manufacturers
Audio equipment manufacturers of Latvia
Manufacturing companies based in Riga
Latvian brands
Electronics companies established in 2007
2007 establishments in Latvia